The Episcopal Diocese of Haiti ( or Dyosèz Ayiti  or Diocèse d'Haïti) is the Anglican Communion diocese consisting of the entire territory of Haiti. It is part of Province 2 of the Episcopal Church in the United States of America. Its cathedral, Holy Trinity located in the corner of Ave. Mgr. Guilloux & Rue Pavée in downtown Port-au-Prince, has been destroyed six times, including in the 2010 Haiti earthquake.

It is the largest diocese in the Episcopal Church, with 89,717 members reported in 2018.

Jean-Zaché Duracin is the current bishop of Haiti. Ogé Beauvoir is bishop suffragan.

History

Holy Trinity parish was established in Port-au-Prince on Pentecost, May 25, 1863. Its church has since been destroyed six times.  The first church was set on fire by Sylvain Salnave in 1866; possibly the second, and definitely the third, were destroyed by fire in 1873; yet another by fire on July 4, 1888; and a fifth by fire on July 5, 1908.  Construction of the sixth Holy Trinity began in 1924.

In 1864, the first Diocesan Synod was held.  Then known as the Haitian Apostolic Orthodox Church, it was recognized as a member of the Anglican Communion in 1870. The Diocese of Haiti formally joined The Episcopal Church of the United States on May 15, 1875. Nearly a century later, Luc Garnier was elected as the first Haitian-born bishop of the diocese.

2010 earthquake
The 2010 Haiti earthquake destroyed much of the infrastructure of the diocese, including Holy Trinity Cathedral and its school, the diocesan offices, the Couvent Sainte Marguerite, the College Saint Pierre, at least four of the diocese's more than 200 schools, and the home of Duracin and his injured wife.

Duracin and the church leadership set up a camp in Port-au-Prince "the size of a football field" where destitute and injured Haitians could seek refuge. Episcopal Relief and Development began working with the Episcopal Diocese of the Dominican Republic to help with Haitians who cross the border, and with IMA World Health to medical help to the wounded around Port-au-Prince. Prior to the earthquake the Episcopal Diocese of Haiti's Development Office had trained a network of 28 community development workers for disaster management. Since the quake, these development agents completed initial needs assessments for their own communities. Two weeks after the quake the Episcopal Diocese of Haiti and Episcopal Relief & Development were helping over 25,000 survivors in 23 camps. Many of the camps are located at the sites of Episcopal churches and schools and range in size from a few hundred people to approximately 8000. Six of the camps inhabited by more than 15,000 survivors were not accessible by vehicles and were supplied by helicopter. Sanitation and clean water facilities were constructed for many of the camps.

Bishops
 James Theodore Holly (1874–1911)
 Harry Roberts Carson (1923–43) * Spence Burton (Suffragan) (1939–1942)
 C. Alfred Voegeli (1943–1971)
 Luc Garnier (1971–1993)
 Jean-Zaché Duracin (1994–Present) * Ogé Beauvoir (2012–Present) (Suffragan)

References

External links
Eglise Episcopale D'Haïti  — official website
La Liturgie ou Formulaire des Prières Publiques à l’usage du Collège Royal et des Ecoles Nationales d’Hayti c. 1815 liturgical text for use by this church, digitized by Richard Mammana
Litiji Kreyol La Anglican Church liturgical materials in Kreyol digitized by Jean Fils Chery and Richard Mammana

1864 establishments in Haiti
Haiti, Episcopal Diocese of
Anglican dioceses established in the 19th century
Haiti
 
Port-au-Prince
Protestantism in Haiti
Religious organizations established in 1864
Province 2 of the Episcopal Church (United States)